is a Japanese actress, model and variety tarento. Kakei is represented by Platinum Production and is an exclusive model for JJ.

Biography
Miwako Kakei was born on 6 March 1994 in Tokyo. Her great-grandmother was Russian. Before her chance to debut, Kakei was in high school in 2011, and was later scouted by her friend from a fashion show. In May 2013, she joined the cast of the reality series Terrace House: Boys × Girls Next Door and later briefly appeared in the 2015 film Terrace House: Closing Door. On 14 September 2013, Kakei was selected in the semi-Grand Prix at the One Life Model audition. Later on 23 September, she started the baseball ceremony at the final round of the Hokkaido Nippon-Ham Fighters' baseball game. In 5 October, Kakei got 68,322 points by public viewing from the viewers, and was selected as the Thursday reporter of "Coco-chō" of Mezamashi TV Later on 19 December, her first official book Mīko Miwako Kakei 1st Official Book was published.

On 4 April 2014, her photo collection Venus Tanjō by Kishin Shinoyama was released.

Works

Videos

Filmography

Variety

TV dramas

Films

Internet dramas

Advertisements

Runways

Stage

Magazines

Catalogues

Music videos

Bibliography

Photo albums

References

Notes

Sources

External links
 
 
 

Japanese television personalities
Japanese female models
Japanese gravure models
21st-century Japanese actresses
Japanese people of Russian descent
People from Tokyo
1994 births
Living people
Models from Tokyo Metropolis